Rhoda Mary Abbott (née Hunt) (14 January 1873 – 18 February 1946) was a passenger on the .  She was the only female passenger who went down with the sinking of the ship and survived.

Early life
Abbott was born Rhoda Mary Hunt in Aylesbury, Buckinghamshire, on 14 January 1873, the daughter of Joseph Hunt and his wife Sarah Green Hunt. She grew up in Aylesbury, and spent her early adulthood in St Albans with her family, before moving to the United States in 1896. Upon her arrival in Providence, Rhode Island, she met London-born middleweight champion Stanton Abbott, whom she married soon after in 1895. The couple had two children, Rossmore (born 21 February 1896) and Eugene (born 31 March 1898). She settled as a housewife and mother and was active at the local Grace Episcopal Church, as well as helping around the house.

In 1911, Abbott was divorced from her husband, returned to England with her sons on the RMS Olympic, and started supporting herself and them by working as a sewer, as well as becoming a soldier in The Salvation Army. However, she quickly realized that the boys were not happy living in England and booked a return to America in April 1912. The family boarded the RMS Titanic as third-class passengers in Southampton on 10 April. Onboard, she befriended Amy Stanley, Emily Goldsmith, and May Howard, who had cabins nearby.

On 15 April 1912, the family was already asleep when the Titanic hit an iceberg. By 00:15, they were alerted by a steward to put on life jackets and retreat to the ship's deck. After waiting in line to follow other third-class passengers to the deck, Abbott and her sons waited at the second-class saloon area. There, her son Rossmore is said to have knelt in prayer asking that his mother's life be spared even if he and his brother were not saved. Even though "only women and children" were allowed past the gate, Abbott's sons (aged 13 and 16) were able to accompany their mother to the lifeboats. They arrived when one of the final remaining lifeboats, Collapsible C, was already being loaded around 02:00. When it was her turn to enter the lifeboat, she realized that her sons would be denied a spot, and stepping back, refused a place in the lifeboat.

When the ship sank, Abbott was swept away from the deck into the water. She tried to clasp her sons but to no avail. Having given up finding them, and at risk of hypothermia in the freezing water, she was able to reach Collapsible Boat A, which was washed off Titanic at 02:15. Hours went by before Fifth Officer Harold Lowe returned to the site with lifeboat 14 to retrieve survivors in the water. Several occupants of Boat A had either succumbed or slipped back into the icy water; of the people on board, Abbott was one of only 13 who survived. Her two sons were lost at sea, and only Rossmore's body was later identified.

According to Rhoda, Abbott had no regret about remaining on the Titanic until the very end, because it allowed her to stay with her sons. On board the rescue ship , Abbott received special care in the smoking room. Her legs were badly damaged by the cold water so that she could not move until arrival in New York. There she was hospitalized for two weeks in Manhattan's St. Vincent's Hospital. She was one of the last survivors to be discharged.

Later life
As a result of the sinking of the Titanic, Abbott had respiratory problems, including severe bouts of asthma, for the rest of her life. On 16 December 1912, she married longtime friend George Charles Williams, and the couple settled in Jacksonville, Florida. By 1928, they had returned to England to settle Williams' father's estate in London. Abbott took care of her husband until his death in 1938. For the remainder of her life she tried to immigrate back to America, but was always refused.

Abbott died in London of heart failure as a result of hypertension on 18 February 1946, at the age of 73.

References

1873 births
1946 deaths
RMS Titanic survivors
People from Aylesbury
British expatriates in the United States